The Vive O 2004! is an album with various artists, released on June 14, 2004 as the official music album for UEFA Euro 2004 in Portugal.

Track listing
"All Together Now" – The Farm
"Beautiful Day" – U2
"You're So Pretty" – Charlatans
"That's Entertainment" – The Jam
"Supersonic" – Oasis
"Riverboat Song" – Ocean Colour Scene
"Welcome To The Cheap Seats" – The Wonderstuff
"Staying Out For The Summer" – Dodgy
"Love Spreads" – The Stone Roses
"England's Irie" – Black Grape
"Born In England" – Twisted X
"Hate to Say I Told You So" – The Hives
"You Get What You Give" – New Radicals
"Going For Gold" – Shed Seven
"Eat My Goal" – Collapsed Lung
"Força" – Nelly Furtado
"My Favourite Game" – The Cardigans
"You and Me Song – The Wannadies
"Walk Away" – Cast

Charts

References

UEFA Euro 2004
2004 compilation albums
UEFA European Championship albums